The Count Fleet Sprint Handicap is a Grade III American Thoroughbred horse race held annually in mid April. It takes place at Oaklawn Park Race Track in Hot Springs, Arkansas. During the race, horses age four and older compete over the sprint distance of six furlongs. Inaugurated in 1974, the event currently offers a purse of US$500,000.

The race is named in honor of the 1943 United States Triple Crown champion, Count Fleet.

In 2020, Whitmore became the first horse to win the Count Fleet Sprint Handicap three times.

Records
Speed record:
 1:08.00 @ 6 furlongs - Bonapaw (2001)

Most wins:
 3 - Whitmore (2017, 2018, 2020)
2 - Dave's Friend (1983, 1984)
 2 - Bordonaro (2006, 2007)
 2 - Semaphore Man (2008, 2009)

Most wins by a jockey:
 5 - Ricardo Santana Jr.  (2013, 2014, 2017, 2018, 2019)

Most wins by a trainer
 4 - Steve Asmussen (2013, 2014, 2019, 2022)

Most wins by an owner:
 3 - Southern Springs Stables/R. V. LaPenta/Head of Plains Partners LLC (2017, 2018)
 2 - Irene C. Udouj (1974, 1977)
 2 - John Franks (1983, 1984)
 2 - Courtlandt Farm (2005, 2006)
 2 - Double Bogey Stable (2008, 2009)

Winners

References

Graded stakes races in the United States
Horse races in Arkansas
Open sprint category horse races
Recurring sporting events established in 1974
Oaklawn Park
1974 establishments in Arkansas
Grade 3 stakes races in the United States